
Year 435 BC was a year of the pre-Julian Roman calendar. At the time, it was known as the First year of the Consulship of Iullus and Tricostus (or, less frequently, year 319 Ab urbe condita). The denomination 435 BC for this year has been used since the early medieval period, when the Anno Domini calendar era became the prevalent method in Europe for naming years.

Events 
 By place 
 Greece 
 A dispute arises between Epidamnus' oligarchs and democratic forces in the Greek colony. Most of the colony's inhabitants originate from Corinth or Corcyra (Corfu).  Epidamnus' oligarchs are exiled and then appeal to Corcyra for help, while the democrats enlist the support of Corinth. Corcyra is then attacked by Corinth as the dispute heats up.

 By topic 
 Art 
 A gold and ivory statue of Zeus, king of the gods, is completed at Elis by the Athenian sculptor Phidias for the Temple of Zeus at Olympia. The statue becomes one of the Seven Wonders of the World. The Olympian Zeus is about seven times life size (or 13 metres) and occupies the full height of the temple.

Births 
 Philoxenus of Cythera, Greek dithyrambic poet (d. 380 BC)

Deaths

References